Buta may refer to:

People
 George Buta, Romanian biathlete
 Buta (rapper), Kosovo-Albanian rapper

Places
 Buta, Democratic Republic of the Congo, a town in the northern Democratic Republic of the Congo
 Buta Territory, Democratic Republic of the Congo
 Boota, a village in Punjab, Pakistan
 Buta, Burundi, a town in Burundi
 Buta, a village in Negrași commune, Argeș County, Romania
 Buta, a village in Crâmpoia commune, Olt County, Romania
 Buta (Jiu), a tributary of the Jiul de Vest in Hunedoara County, Romania
 Buta, a tributary of the Lotru in Vâlcea County, Romania
 Buta Mică, a tributary of the river Buta in Hunedoara County, Romania

Other
 Buta language
 Buta (film), a 2011 Azerbaijani film
 Buta (ornament), an almond-shaped ornament with a sharp-curved upper end
 Paisley (design) or buta, an Iranian droplet/flame shaped motif used in carpet design
 Buta, a Philippine term for karst caves and holes where edible bird's nests are found
 Buta Airways, an Azerbaijani airline